The women's marathon at the 2010 European Athletics Championships was held on the streets of Barcelona on 31 July. The event doubled as the European Team Marathon Cup 2010.

Doping
Živilė Balčiūnaitė of Lithuania originally won the marathon and was awarded the gold medal, but was disqualified for doping after she tested positive for testosterone. Nailiya Yulamanova of Russia originally came second, and was set to be upgraded to gold winner after Živilė Balčiūnaitė was disqualified. However, in July 2012, Yulamanova was also disqualified for doping, as her results from 20 August 2009 onwards were annulled due to abnormalities in her biological passport profile.

Anna Incerti (gold), Tetyana Filonyuk (silver) and Isabellah Andersson (bronze) received the medals by mail.

Medalists

Records

Schedule

Results

See also
 2010 European Marathon Cup

References

External links
Results
 Results
Fullresults

Marathon
Marathons at the European Athletics Championships
European Athletics Championships
Women's marathons
2010 in women's athletics
Marathons in Spain